Sooner or Later may refer to:

Music

Albums
 Sooner or Later (BBMak album), 2000
 Sooner or Later (Murray Head album), 1987
 Sooner or Later (Rex Smith album), 1979
 Sooner or Later in Spain, 2006 DVD/CD by Marah

Songs
 "Sooner or Later" (Duncan James song)
 "Sooner or Later" (The Forester Sisters song), 1987
 "Sooner or Later" (Larry Graham song), 1982
 "Sooner or Later" (Madonna song), 1990
 "Sooner or Later" (Michelle Branch song), 2009
 "Sooner or Later" (The Jades song)
 "Sooner or Later" (Breaking Benjamin song), 2004
 "Sooner or Later" (Jeff Lynne song), 1984
 "Sooner or Later", a song by The Alan Parsons Project from Vulture Culture
 "Sooner or Later", a song by House of Heroes
 "Sooner or Later" (N.E.R.D. song)
 "Sooner or Later" (The Grass Roots song), 1971 (also covered by GF4 in 1994)
 "Sooner or Later", a song by Monrose from Strictly Physical
 "Sooner or Later", a song by Dusty Springfield from White Heat
 "Sooner or Later", a song by Michael Tolcher from I Am
 "Sooner or Later", a song from Song of the South
 "Sooner or Later", a song by Switchfoot
 "Sooner or Later", a song by Mat Kearney from Young Love
 "One of Us Must Know (Sooner or Later)", a 1966 song by Bob Dylan

Other
 "Sooner or Later" (Garfield and Friends), episode
 Sooner or Later (1920 film), a 1920 American comedy film directed by Wesley Ruggles
 Sooner or Later (1979 film), a 1979 American television film starring Rex Smith

See also
 
 
 Sooner (disambiguation)
 Later (disambiguation)